, also known as "Ocean Day" or "Sea Day", is a public holiday in Japan usually celebrated on the third Monday in July. The purpose of the holiday is to give thanks for the ocean's bounty and to consider the importance of the ocean to Japan as a maritime nation.

Many people take advantage of the holiday and summer weather to take a beach trip. Other ocean-related festivities are observed as well. The date roughly coincides with the end of the rainy season (梅雨 tsuyu) in much of the Japan mainland.

In 2020, the holiday was observed on Thursday, July 23, a one-time move that was made as a special accommodation to support the opening of the Tokyo Olympics. Due to the postponement of the Olympics, the 2021 date was moved to July 22, also on Thursday as a one-time holiday.

History

The day was known as  until 1996. Communications Minister Shozo Murata designated the day in 1941 to commemorate the Meiji Emperor and his 1876 voyage in the Meiji Maru, an iron steamship constructed in Scotland in 1874. The voyage included a trip around the Tōhoku region, embarking on a lighthouse boat in Aomori, and a brief stop in Hakodate before returning to Yokohama on July 20 of that year. However, it was not designated a national holiday until 1995, when it became the first holiday in the summer months.

First observed on July 20, 1996, the Happy Monday System legislation moved the date to the third Monday of July beginning in 2003.

As special arrangement for the 2020 Summer Olympics, the 2020 date for Marine Day was moved to July 23. With the Olympics and Paralympics postponed until 2021 due to the COVID-19 pandemic, the government left this change in place for 2020 and passed an amendment to the Olympic and Paralympic Special Measures Act to make a corresponding change to the holiday in 2021.

Celebration 
On this day, families may visit beaches such as Isshiki Beach in Hayama and swim, snorkel, surf, or dive. People may also participate in an event called 'mud-ball throwing'. National aquariums also host special water-related events on this day.

References

External links
 Book entry about the Meiji Maru
Marine Day Celebration

Public holidays in Japan
Water transport in Japan
July observances
Environmental awareness days
Holidays and observances by scheduling (nth weekday of the month)